Sidney William McNabney (January 15, 1929 – February 7, 1957) was a Canadian professional ice hockey centre who played five playoff games for the Montreal Canadiens of the National Hockey League in 1951. He managed to garner one assist in those five games. McNabney and Leo Thiffault are the only players to play five play-off games in the NHL without playing any regular-season games.

McNabney died at the age of 28 due to cancer.

References

External links

1929 births
1957 deaths
Barrie Flyers players
Buffalo Bisons (AHL) players
Canadian ice hockey centres
Montreal Canadiens players
Ice hockey people from Toronto
Syracuse Warriors players